Penny De Los Santos is a documentary, culinary photographer, a senior contributor to Saveur Magazine and co-authored or contributed to more than a dozen food and culture books.

Early life 

Santos was born in Germany to an American family. She moved to Texas, where she spent the rest of her adolescence. She graduated from Texas A&M University with a major in Journalism. In 1996, she earned a master's degree in Communications from Ohio University.  She was a staff photographer at the San Jose Mercury News.

Career 
Since 2006, De Los Santos has been a senior contributing photographer for Saveur Magazine, traveling to more than 30 countries. In February 2009, De Los Santos launched a food blog, where she documents the food and culture in her travel destinations as well as her personal life. She regularly contributes to National Geographic, Sports Illustrated, Newsweek, Time, Latina and Texas Monthly.

Personal life 
De Los Santos is gay and is based in New York City. She is of Mexican heritage.

Awards

 National Press Photographers Association College Photographer of the Year (1998)
 Parson’s School of Design Marty Fortier Fellowship
 California New Media Award

Books
Penny De Los Santos has contributed to multiple books and co-authored five books related to food and culture :

Asian Dumplings: Mastering Gyoza, Spring Rolls, Samosas, and More[1] by Andrea Nguyen and Penny De Los Santos.
The New Steak: Recipes for a Range of Cuts plus Savory Sides by Cree LeFavour and Penny De Los Santos.
The New Taste of Chocolate: A Cultural & Natural History of Cacao with Recipes by Maricel E. Presilla and Penny De Los Santos
Mediterranean Vegetarian Feasts by Aglaia Kremezi and Penny De Los Santos
Richard Sandoval's New Latin Flavors: Hot Dishes, Cool Drinks by Richard Sandoval and Penny De Los Santos

External links 
 Penny De Los Santos Website
 Penny De Los Santos Blog
 Penny De Los Santos Instagram

References

Living people
American photojournalists
Texas A&M University alumni
American women photographers
Year of birth missing (living people)
The Mercury News people
American people of Mexican descent
21st-century American women
Women photojournalists